George Mihăiță (born 23 September 1948 in Moreni) is a Romanian actor, director and philanthropist. Renowned for his distinctive voice, Mihăiță has appeared in over 70 films and is regarded as a Romanian film icon.

He studied in the Institute of Theatrical Art and Cinematography of Bucharest, now known as the Caragiale National University of Theatre and Film, and graduated with honors. He has worked as an actor for more than forty years, both in cinema and theater. He is the renovator of teenagers education in Romania.

The Director of Salut magazine and Salut Generation Pro, two editorials that made history among the Romanian newspapers, Mihăiţă also was named the honorific director of Super Magazine. George is the founder of the teenager's day. He is also the President of UNESCO Club for teenagers and during the last six years he has been the director of The Comedy Theater in Bucharest. Also was the founder and director of FESTCO - The Festival of Romanian Comedy in Bucharest.

Filmography 
The Reenactment director Lucian Pintilie, 1968 
The Warmth director Șerban Creangă, 1969     
Voiceless Friends directors Paul Fritz Nemeth, Gheorghe Turcu, 1969  
 The Castle of the Doomed director Mihai Iacob, 1970 
The Miscellaneous Brigade on the Watch director Mircea Drăgan, 1971 
Veronica director Elisabeta Bostan, 1972 
The Trap director Manole Marcus, 1973 
Veronica Comes Back Elisabeta Bostan, 1973 
Philip the Kind director Dan Pița, 1974 
Picture Postcards with Wild Flowers director Andrei Blaier, 1974 
The Wall director Constantin Vaeni, 1974 
A Fantastic Comedy director Ion Popescu-Gopo, 1975
Accident director Sergiu Nicolaescu, 1976 
Rock'n'Roll Wolf director Elisabeta Bostan, 1976
 Totally Unprepared director Pierre Bokor, 1976 
Solitude's Last Night director Virgil Calotescu, 1976 
The Last Days of Summer director Savel Stiopul, 1976 
For the country director Sergiu Nicolaescu, 1977 
The Arms of Venus director Mircea Drăgan, 1978 
Uncertain Roads director Virgil Calotescu, 1978 
The man we need director Manole Marcus, 1979 
The Last Night of Love director Sergiu Nicolaescu, 1979 
Trap for Hired Guns director Sergiu Nicolaescu, 1981 
The Duel director Sergiu Nicolaescu, 1981 
Circus Performers director Elisabeta Bostan, 1981 
Circus Performers at the North Pole director Elisabeta Bostan, 1981 
Melodies in Costineşti director Constantin Păun, 1982 
Zacharicus director Claude Grinberg, 1983 
Promises director Elisabeta Bostan, 1985 
François Villon: the Maverick Poet director Sergiu Nicolaescu, 1987 
A Sunday in the Family director Francisc Munteanu, 1987 
Some Great Guys director Cornel Diaconu, 1987 
Sunny Smile director Elisabeta Bostan, 1987 
a Woman Champion director Elisabeta Bostan, 1989 
Direct Broadcast from Paradise director Cornel Diaconu, 1994 
Point Zero director Sergiu Nicolaescu, 1995 
The Man Of The Day director Dan Pița, 1998
Survivor director Sergiu Nicolaescu, 2008
The Silent Wedding  director Horațiu Mălăele, 2008
Somewhere in Palilula (2012)

Theatre

The Comedy Theater

Castor / Polux – Fata Morgana by Dumitru Solomon, director Mihai Dimiu, 1971
Soldier- Mother Courage and Her Children by Bertolt Brecht, director Lucian Giurchescu, 1972 
Billy the Kid- Indians by Arthur Kopit, director Lucian Giurchescu, 1973 
Spiridon – A Stormy Night by Ion Luca Caragiale, director Lucian Giurchescu, 1973 
Nano - Volpone by Ben Jonson, director Ion Cojar, 1974 
Arlequin - The Game of Love and Chance by Pierre de Marivaux, director Tudor Florian, 1976
Juror no 8 - Twelve Angry Men by Reginald Rose, director G. Teodorescu, 1977 
Soldier - The Caucasian Chalk Circle by Bertolt Brecht, director Lucian Giurchescu, 1977 
Cristian Marinescu – The Wisdom - Tooth by Corneliu Marcu, director G. Teodorescu, 1978 
Trofimov - The Cherry Orchard by Anton Chekhov, director Lucian Giurchescu, 1979 
Barnaby Tacher - The Matchmaker by Thornton Wilder, director Valeriu Moisescu, 1979 
Harold - Harold and Maude by Colin Higgins, director Sanda Manu, 1980 
The Ghost - Here is a ghost by Kōbō Abe, director Cătălina Buzoianu, 1982 
Bouzin – Cat among the pigeons by Georges Feydeau, director Ion Lucian, 1989 
Willy - What we'll gonna do without Willy? by G. Astaloș, director L. Szekely Anton, 1992 
Mercur - Amphytrion by Molière, director Valeriu Moisescu, 1993
Thersites - Troilus and Cressida by William Shakespeare, director Dragoș Galgoțiu, 1994 
Arthur, Beetles King - Flight by Mikhail Bulgakov, director Cătălina Buzoianu, 1995 
Ferdinard – An Italian Straw hat by Eugène Labiche, director Horațiu Mălăele, 1998 
Henry Perkins – Funny Money by Ray Cooney, director Horaţiu Mălăele, 2001 
Titel – Poker by Adrian Lustig, director Alexandru Tocilescu, 2004
Pissale – Ubu Enchained by Alfred Jarry, director Gábor Tompa, 2004
The Mayor – The Government Inspector by Nikolai Gogol, director Horațiu Mălăele, 2006

Bulandra Theater
The Journalistsby Alexandru Mirodan, director Valeriu Moisescu, 1971

The National Theater Bucharest
Guliţă – Mad'me Chiriţa by Vasile Alecsandri, director Horea Popescu, 1969

Baia Mare Theater
Spiridon – A Stormy Night by Ion Luca Caragiale, director Magda Bordeianu, 1972

Television 
Let's fill the earth with dreams! By Dan Tărchilă, director Eugen Todoran
Doctor in philosophy by  Branislav Nuşici, director Matei Alexandru
The Sicilian Woman by Aurel Baranga, director Olimpia Arghir
Chief of Soul sector by Alexandru Mirodan, director Letiţia Popa
Boldness by Gheorghe Vlad, director Letiţia Popa
Spring Violins by Al. Stein, director  Domniţa Munteanu
Marriage is not a game by I.D. Şerban, director Olimpia Arghir
On Holiday by Constantin  Stoiciu, director Andrei Blaier
The Girl Who Moved Parâng by I.D. Şerban, director Nae Cosmescu
The Journalists by Alexandru Mirodan, director Valeriu Moisescu
Hope never dies at dawn by  Romul Guga, director Nae Cosmescu
Impossible Marriage by Alex Ştefănescu, director Silviu Jicman
Duck head by Gheorghe Ciprian, director Constantin Dicu
When a Baby Comes by André Roussin, director Constantin Dicu
Caragiale,but not theater director Sanda Manu
The pursuit director Radu Gabrea
The Muşatin director Sorana Coroamă Stanca
Matrimonial Agency director Gelu Colceag
Maria's secret produced  by  Antena 1
Incoming Police director Phil Ramuno
The Heritage produced by Pro TV

Directing 

 Sun for two, 2007

Books
 George Mihăiţă-Teenagers drama-Nobody is alone-2002

References

External links 
 
 the comedy theater

Romanian male actors
Romanian film directors
Gheorghe Lazăr National College (Bucharest) alumni
Living people
1948 births
People from Moreni
Caragiale National University of Theatre and Film alumni